Viiratsi (before 1920: Wieratz) is a small borough in Viljandi Parish, Viljandi County, Estonia. As of 2011 Census, the settlement's population was 1,332.

The Commander-in-chief of the Estonian Army Johan Laidoner (1884–1953) was born in Raja farmstead near Viiratsi, site now located in nearby Vardja village.

References

External links
Viiratsi Parish 

Boroughs and small boroughs in Estonia
Populated places in Viljandi County
Viljandi Parish
Kreis Fellin